The Republic of Marshall Islands consists of 30 atolls (each made up of many islets) and 5 islands, which can be divided into two island chains, Ralik Chain and Ratak Chain.

Inhabited municipalities
Administratively, the country is divided into 24 inhabited municipalities, corresponding to the 24 inhabited atolls or islands, where each of them is an electoral district.

Uninhabited atolls/islands
The remaining 11 atolls/islands are currently uninhabited. According to the Constitution of the Republic of the Marshall Islands, the uninhabited atolls/islands Narikrik, Erikub, Jemo, Taka, Bikar, Bokak, Rongrik and Ailinginae shall each be included in the electoral district with which it is most closely associated, pursuant to the customary law or any traditional practice. Ujelang is listed with the Enewetak & Ujelang District, and Bikini with the Bikini & Kili District.

See also
ISO 3166-2:MH

References

External links
Geography, Embassy of the Republic of the Marshall Islands, Washington, D.C.
Marshall Islands, GeoHive
Municipalities of the Marshall Islands, Statoids.com

 
Marshall Islands
Marshall Islands
Marshall Islands-related lists